Lingam Suryanarayana MBBS, MS, FACS (Telugu: లింగం సూర్యనారాయణ) is distinguished Surgeon of Andhra Pradesh, India. He was Principal of Andhra and Guntur Medical Colleges and Vice Chancellor of NTR University of Health Sciences.

He was born on 16 May 1923. He completed a M.B.B.S. degree in 1946 and a M.S. degree in General Surgery in 1949 from Andhra Medical College, Visakhapatnam.

He worked as assistant professor of Surgery till 1964. He went for training in higher centres of USA for one year. He was transferred to Guntur Medical College as professor and Head of the department of Surgery. He worked as Hospital superintendent from 1968 to 1974 and Principal of the college in 1974. He was transferred to Visakhapatnam in 1974 as Principal and Head of the Department of Surgery of Andhra Medical College. He was promoted as Additional Director of Medical Education, Hyderabad in 1975 and worked till 1978.

His administrative capabilities took him the post of Pro Vice Chancellor of Andhra Pradesh University of Health Sciences in 1987 and later became Vice Chancellor on 22 February 1988 till 18 April 1994. As Vice chancellor he visited Japan, United States, Canada, Geneva and Bangkok as a WHO participant.

He was chairman of a number of workshops on Medical Education and Health legislation. He published numerous papers including papers on "Social Context of Medical Education, Health Sciences in National productivity and relevance of University of Health Sciences."

He is life member of Indian Medical Association, Association of Surgeons of India and Indian Association for Advancement of Medical Education. He was founder President of Andhra Pradesh Chapter of Association of Surgeons of India. He is a Fellow of the American College of Surgeons and International College of Surgeons and Honorary Fellow of International Medical Sciences Academy.

He actively contributes to the social service through various organizations. He was Secretary, President and Zonal Chairman of Lions Club of Visakhapatnam and Guntur. He is a strong philanthropist and contributed handsomely for the construction of Guest house for Andhra Medical College Old Students Association at Visakhapatnam.

Dr. Lingam Suryanarayana Trophy was instituted for the winner in the All India Grand Prix open bridge tournament conducted by the Waltair Club at Visakhapatnam.

Awards
He is recipient of Vijaya Shri Award, Distinguished Scientist of India Award and Surgeon of Eminence Award.
He was awarded Honorary doctorate (Doctor of Science) by the N.T.R. University of Health Sciences on its seventh convocation in 2003.

Publications
L. Suryanarayana, K. Vembu, R. Rajalakshmi and C. Satyanarayana:Performance of National Tuberculosis Programme, 1993:an appraisal, Indian Journal of Tuberculosis., 1995, 42, 121.
Suryanarayan, L. and Jagannatha, P.S. (2001) Scoring method for diagnosis of tuberculosis in children: an evaluation. Indian Journal of Tuberculosis, 48. pp. 101–103.

References

Telugu people
Indian surgeons
1923 births
Living people
Scientists from Andhra Pradesh
20th-century Indian medical doctors
Heads of universities and colleges in India
20th-century surgeons
Principals of Andhra Medical College
Indian expatriates in the United States